Rodemis Dantes Trifu (born 8 October 1995) is a Romanian professional footballer who plays as a midfielder for CSO Filiași.

References

External links
 
 

1995 births
Living people
Sportspeople from Craiova
Romanian footballers
Association football midfielders
Liga I players
Liga II players
CS Pandurii Târgu Jiu players